Ivan C. James Jr. (1916–2014) was an American engineer in St. Louis.

Personal life 
Ivan C. James Jr. was born in 1916 to Ivan C. James and Lottie B. James. He attended West Bell School, Sumner High School, Lincoln University, and finally, the Milwaukee School of Engineering. Despite living in a time of severe racial segregation and limited opportunities, he was inspired by faculty members at his high school to value his education and pursue his dreams. He credits three teachers in particular—Ms. Anderson, Mr. Davenport, and Ms. Alford—with this encouragement and motivation. These teachers pushed him to use outside resources, such as the St. Louis Public Library, and emphasized the importance of African-Americans in American history and literature. Most notably, these teachers highlighted the fact that the place of African-Americans in American history was still evolving and changing, sparking his desire to take his education further.

Education 
Ivan C. James Jr. graduated from Sumner High School and applied and accepted to Lincoln University in Jefferson City, Missouri.  His true desire was to earn an engineering degree and he applied to the University of Missouri-Rolla.  The State of Missouri and the University System did not accept African-American students into the engineering program at that time.  Although disappointed and frustrated he did not let that deter him and he soon found a school that would accept he and a fellow student.  Ivan was accepted and attended the Milwaukee School of Engineering studying Stationary Engineering, known today as Mechanical Engineering.

After Lincoln University, Ivan C. James Jr. attended a historically all-white school, the Milwaukee School of Engineering. He and two fellow Lincoln University graduates were the first African-Americans to attend the school. He took a personal interest in recruiting more African-Americans to follow in his footsteps.

Upon graduation with his prized Engineering Degree in hand, he returned to St. Louis and sought to find a job as an engineer.

Career 
Ivan C. James Jr. applied to Emerson Electric, however they would not offer him an engineering position and he began as a porter, but his true aspiration was to be a stationary engineer. These jobs were only available to African-Americans in St. Louis public schools, hospitals and in the St. Louis Housing Authority, all serving African-American communities and communities. He did not let these limitations deter his ambitions, Ivan C. James Jr. soon found an opportunity at Homer G. Phillips Hospital near his former high school in North St. Louis. Desiring to increase his career advancement opportunities he completed engineering courses at Washington University in St. Louis.

These additional courses and his 5+ years of experience at Homer G. Phillips Hospital provided Ivan the necessary skills to apply and join the St. Louis Housing Authority as Stationary Engineer responsible for the central plant at one then another Housing Authority Community.

Outside work, James collected African-American historical materials, such as books and pamphlets, which he donated for preservation in later life.

Legacy 
Ivan C. James Jr. was alive during a time of immense historical changes. He witnessed both social and legal changes pertaining to the rights of African-Americans and an exponential increase in the amount of opportunities available for African-Americans to pursue. His personal advice to those striving to follow in his footsteps was: "Don't give up. Education is the key, and just keep plugging, plugging, plugging."

A scholarship named after him, offered by the S.E.E. Opportunities Foundation, exemplifies this ideology. The scholarship is granted to middle schools students who win a research essay-writing contest. It focuses on students interested in pursuing engineering and STEM careers.

References 

African-American engineers
Lincoln University (Missouri) alumni
McKelvey School of Engineering alumni
1916 births
2014 deaths
American engineers